Irenka is the second studio album by Polish singer Sanah. It was released by Magic Records and Universal Music Polska on 7 May 2021.

Irenka is a combination of electropop and indie pop. In addition to new tracks, the album also includes six songs previously included on her second extended play Bujda (2020). The album was produced by Thomas Martin Leithead-Docherty (Tom Martin), Edward Leithead-Docherty, Jakub Galiński, Arkadiusz Kopera, Mariusz Obijalski and Paul Whalley.

It peaked at number one on the Polish albums chart and has been certified two-times diamond. Three singles preceded the album's release; "Ale jazz!", the album's lead single, "2:00" and "Etc. (na disco)". "Ten stan" was announced as the album's fourth single. "Cześć, jak się masz?" and "Kolońska i szlugi" only appears on the Final edition of Irenka.

Track listing

Charts

Weekly charts

Year-end charts

Certifications

Release history

See also
 List of number-one albums of 2021 (Poland)

References

2021 albums
Polish-language albums
Sanah (singer) albums
Magic Records albums
Universal Music Group albums